Desaguadero may refer to:

Rivers 
 Desaguadero River (Argentina), a river in Argentina, also known as Río Salado
 Desaguadero River (Bolivia and Peru), a river originated in Lake Titicaca in the border of Peru and Bolivia

Places 
 Desaguadero, Argentina
 Desaguadero, Bolivia-Peru, the capital town of Desaguadero District, Chucuito Province, Puno Department, Peru
 Desaguadero District, in Chucuito Province, Puno Department, Peru
 Desaguadero (La Paz), a village in Desaguadero Municipality, Ingavi Province, La Paz Department, Bolivia
 Desaguadero Municipality, in Ingavi Province, La Paz Department, Bolivia